Salvia vasta is a perennial plant that is native to Hubei province in China, growing on the margins of fields and on hillsides.

There are two named varieties. The margin of the middle lobe of the corolla lip of Salvia vasta var. vasta is entire or undulate, while that of Salvia vasta var. fimbriata is fimbriate-denticulate.

References

vasta
Flora of China